Laurent Lafforgue (born 6 November 1966) is a French mathematician. He has made outstanding contributions to Langlands' program in the fields of number theory and analysis, and in particular proved the Langlands conjectures for the automorphism group of a function field. The crucial contribution by Lafforgue to solve this question is the construction of compactifications of certain moduli stacks of shtukas. The proof was the result of more than six years of concentrated efforts.

In 2002 at the 24th International Congress of Mathematicians in Beijing, China, he received the Fields Medal together with Vladimir Voevodsky.

Biography 
Laurent Lafforgue has two brothers, Thomas and Vincent, both mathematicians. Thomas is now a teacher in a classe préparatoire aux grandes écoles at Lycée Louis le Grand in Paris and Vincent a CNRS directeur de recherches at the Institut Fourier in Grenoble.

He won 2 silver medals at International Mathematical Olympiad (IMO) in 1984 and 1985. He entered the École Normale Supérieure in 1986. In 1994 he received his Ph.D. under the direction of Gérard Laumon in the Arithmetic and Algebraic Geometry team at the Université de Paris-Sud. Currently he is a research director of CNRS. He was detached as permanent professor of mathematics at the Institut des Hautes Études Scientifiques (IHÉS) in Bures-sur-Yvette, France, in 2000-2021. In 2021, he left his IHÉS position and moved to Huawei.

Laurent is a devout Catholic and never married.

Career
His younger brother Vincent Lafforgue is also a notable mathematician. On 22 May 2011 Lafforgue was awarded an honorary Doctor of Science from the University of Notre Dame.

Views
Lafforgue is a critic of what he calls the "pedagogically correct" in France's educational system. In 2005, he was forced to resign from the Haut conseil de l'éducation after he expressed these views in a private letter that he sent to Bruno Racine, president of the HCE, that later was made public.

Works
Expository articles
 Lafforgue, L. Chtoucas de Drinfeld et applications. [Drinfelʹd shtukas and applications] Proceedings of the International Congress of Mathematicians, Vol. II (Berlin, 1998). Doc. Math. 1998, Extra Vol. II, 563–570.
 Lafforgue, Laurent. Chtoucas de Drinfeld, formule des traces d'Arthur-Selberg et correspondance de Langlands. [Drinfelʹd shtukas, Arthur-Selberg trace formula and Langlands correspondence] Proceedings of the International Congress of Mathematicians, Vol. I (Beijing, 2002), 383–400, Higher Ed. Press, Beijing, 2002. 
Research articles
 Lafforgue, Laurent. Chtoucas de Drinfeld et correspondance de Langlands. [Drinfelʹd shtukas and Langlands correspondence] Invent. Math. 147 (2002), no. 1, 1–241.

Notes

References
Gérard Laumon, The Work of Laurent Lafforgue, Proceedings of the ICM, Beijing 2002, vol. 1, 91–97
Gérard Laumon, La correspondance de Langlands sur les corps de fonctions (d'après Laurent Lafforgue), Séminaire Bourbaki, 52e année, 1999–2000, no. 873

External links
 Official home page (in French)
 
 
 
 Lafforgue and education in France L’Affaire Lafforgue (in Portuguese)

1966 births
Living people
People from Antony, Hauts-de-Seine
French Roman Catholics
Members of the French Academy of Sciences
20th-century French mathematicians
21st-century French mathematicians
Algebraic geometers
Number theorists
Paris-Sud University alumni
École Normale Supérieure alumni
Lycée Louis-le-Grand alumni
Fields Medalists
Clay Research Award recipients
French National Centre for Scientific Research scientists
Huawei people
International Mathematical Olympiad participants
Paris-Saclay University people
Paris-Saclay University alumni
Research directors of the French National Centre for Scientific Research